

Donald Edward Sheldon (November 21, 1921 – January 26, 1975) was a famous Alaskan bush pilot who pioneered the technique of glacier landings on Mount McKinley (now Denali) during the 1950s and 1960s.

Sheldon was born in Mt. Morrison, Colorado and grew up in Wyoming. At age 17 he journeyed to Alaska to seek work and adventure.

Although he was already a pilot, Sheldon served in World War II as a gunner in a B-17 Flying Fortress crew over Europe. There he flew 26 missions and was awarded the Distinguished Flying Cross and four Air Medals.

From his base in Talkeetna, Alaska, he operated Talkeetna Air Service, which ferried climbers, hunters, fishermen, and others to places inaccessible to ground transportation. Over the years, he assisted in numerous rescue operations, both civilian and military, and was awarded an Alaska Certificate of Achievement for his help. His planes, which included Piper Super Cubs, Cessna 180s and Aeronca Sedans were equipped with an assortment of landing gear, including skis, floats and large, soft rubber wheels. Sheldon died of cancer in 1975.

Notes

Bibliography
 Greiner, James. (1974). Wager with the Wind: The Don Sheldon Story. New York: St. Martin's Press. 
 Mason, Mort (2002). Flying the Alaska Wild. Stillwater, Minnesota: Voyageur Press. .

Additional sources
 Phinizy, Coles (February 14, 1972). "Off Into The Wild White Yonder." Sports Illustrated. Accessed July 2012.

1921 births
1975 deaths
Aviators from Alaska
Bush pilots
People from Matanuska-Susitna Borough, Alaska
Recipients of the Distinguished Flying Cross (United States)